Cucumispora is a genus of fungus in the family Nosematidae.

See also 

 List of Microsporidian genera
 List of invasive species in Europe

References 

Parasitic fungi
Microsporidia genera